Robert Gerald Smith (born February 23, 1933) is a former American football halfback who played two seasons in the National Football League (NFL) with the Cleveland Browns and Philadelphia Eagles. He was drafted by the Browns in the fifteenth round of the 1955 NFL Draft. He played college football at the University of Nebraska–Lincoln and attended Grand Island Senior High School in Grand Island, Nebraska.

References

External links
Just Sports Stats

Living people
1933 births
Players of American football from Iowa
American football halfbacks
Nebraska Cornhuskers football players
Cleveland Browns players
People from Council Bluffs, Iowa